Noel Kennelly is a footballer from the Listowel Emmets club in North Kerry. He is a son of former Kerry great Tim Kennelly and older brother of Tadhg Kennelly. He won an All-Ireland SFC medal with Kerry in 2000. He won an All-Ireland Under 21 medal in 1998 and played in the losing final of 1999, he also played in the losing All-Ireland Minor final in 1996.

Honours
Inter-county
 All-Ireland Senior Championship 1: 2000
 All-Ireland U21 Championship 1: 1988
 Munster Senior Championship 3: 1998, 2000, 2001
 Munster Minor Championship 2: 1996, 1997
 Munster U21 Championship 3: 1997, 1998, 1999

Club
 Kerry Senior Football Championship 1: 2007
 Kerry Under-21 Football Championship 2: 1997, 1998
 Kerry Intermediate Football Championship 1: 2002
 Kerry Junior Football Championship 1: 1999
 North Kerry Senior Championship 7: 1997, 1998, 2004, 2008, 2009, 2013, 2015

College
 Sigerson Cup 1: 1999

References

1979 births
Living people
Noel
Kerry inter-county Gaelic footballers
Listowel Emmets Gaelic footballers
People from Listowel
Winners of one All-Ireland medal (Gaelic football)